The 2005 Major League Baseball postseason was the playoff tournament of Major League Baseball for the 2005 season. The winners of the League Division Series would move on to the League Championship Series to determine the pennant winners that face each other in the World Series.

In the American League, the New York Yankees returned for the eleventh straight year, the Boston Red Sox returned for the third year in a row, the now-Los Angeles Angels of Anaheim made their third appearance in the past four years, and the Chicago White Sox returned for the second time in six years.

In the National League, the Atlanta Braves made their fourteenth straight postseason appearance, the San Diego Padres returned for the first time since 1998, the St. Louis Cardinals returned for the fifth time in six years, and the Houston Astros returned for the third time in five years.

The postseason began on October 4, 2005, and ended on October 26, 2005, with the White Sox sweeping the Astros in the 2005 World Series. It was Chicago's first World Series title since 1917, which marked the end of the Curse of the Black Sox.

Playoff seeds
The following teams qualified for the postseason:

American League
 Chicago White Sox – AL Central champions, AL regular season champions, 99–63
 Los Angeles Angels of Anaheim – AL West champions, 95–67 (6–4 head-to-head record vs. NYY)
 New York Yankees – AL East champions, 95–67 (4–6 head-to-head record vs. LAA; 10–9 head-to-head record vs. BOS)
 Boston Red Sox – 95–67 (9–10 head-to-head record vs. NYY)

National League
 St. Louis Cardinals – NL Central champions, NL regular season champions, best record in baseball, 100–62
 Atlanta Braves – NL East champions, 90–72
 San Diego Padres – NL West champions, 82–80
 Houston Astros – 89–73

Playoff bracket

Note: Two teams in the same division could not meet in the division series.

American League Division Series

(1) Chicago White Sox vs. (4) Boston Red Sox

The White Sox swept the defending World Series champion Red Sox to return to the ALCS for the first time since 1993. It was the first playoff series win for the White Sox since the 1917 World Series. The White Sox prevailed in a blowout victory in Game 1, and then took Game 2 by one run to go up 2-0 in the series headed to Boston. In Game 3, the White Sox closed out the series with a 5-3 win.

(2) Los Angeles Angels of Anaheim vs. (3) New York Yankees

†: Game was postponed due to rain on October 8

This was the second postseason meeting between the Yankees and Angels. The Angels defeated the Yankees in five games to return to the ALCS for the second time in five years.

Games 1 and 2 were split by both teams in Anaheim. The Angels won a high-scoring Game 3, 11-7, to take the series lead, however the Yankees narrowly prevailed in Game 4 to send the series back to Anaheim for a winner-take-all Game 5. The Angels won Game 5 by a 5-3 score and advanced to the ALCS.

The Angels and Yankees would meet again in the ALCS in 2009, which was won by the Yankees en route to a World Series title.

National League Division Series

(1) St. Louis Cardinals vs. (3) San Diego Padres

This was the first postseason meeting between these two teams since 1996. The Cardinals swept the Padres once again to return to the NLCS for the second year in a row. Both teams would meet again in the NLDS the next year, which the Cardinals won in four games.

(2) Atlanta Braves vs. (4) Houston Astros 

In the fifth postseason meeting between these two teams, the Astros once again defeated the Braves to advance to the NLCS for the second year in a row, capped off by an 18-inning Game 4 where the Astros won on a walk-off home run by Chris Burke. The Braves and Astros would meet again in the 2021 World Series, which the Braves won in six games.

The loss to the Astros in the NLDS marked the end of the Braves’ postseason appearance streak, which started in 1991. Since the start of the MLB Postseason playoff tournament in 1969, no team has matched the Braves’ 14-year streak of consecutive postseason appearances.

American League Championship Series

(1) Chicago White Sox vs. (2) Los Angeles Angels of Anaheim 

This was the second time where the White Sox faced a team from California in the postseason. They previously faced the Los Angeles Dodgers in the 1959 World Series, who defeated them in six games. The White Sox defeated the Angels in five games to return to the World Series for the first time since 1959.

In Chicago, the Angels stole Game 1, while in Game 2, the White Sox narrowly prevailed thanks to a complete game performance by Mark Buehrle. When the series moved to Anaheim, Jon Garland pitched another complete game for the White Sox, securing a 5-2 win to go up 2-1 in the series. Johnny Garcia pitched Chicago's third straight complete game in Game 4, which the White Sox won in a blowout, 8-2, to go up 3-1 in the series. Then, in Game 5, José Contreras pitched a fourth straight complete game in a 6-3 victory to secure the pennant. The White Sox became the second team in MLB history to pitch four straight complete games in the postseason; the only other team to do so being their cross-town rivals in the Chicago Cubs, who first accomplished that feat in the 1907 World Series.

As of 2022, this is the last time the White Sox won the AL pennant. This was also the last time a Chicago-based MLB team won the pennant until 2016, when the Chicago Cubs defeated the Los Angeles Dodgers in six games en route to winning the World Series. The Angels returned to the ALCS in 2009, but fell to the New York Yankees in six games.

National League Championship Series

(1) St. Louis Cardinals vs. (4) Houston Astros 

This was a rematch of the previous year's ALCS, which the Cardinals won in seven games. The Astros defeated the Cardinals in six games to advance to the World Series for the first time in franchise history. 

Both teams split the first two games in St. Louis. When the series moved to Houston, the Astros took Games 3 and 4 by one run each to go up 3-1 in the series. In Game 5, Albert Pujols hit a three-run home run in the top of the ninth to give the Cardinals a narrow one run win, sending the series back to St. Louis. However, the Astros would clinch the pennant in Game 6 thanks to a solid pitching performance from Roy Oswalt, who was named NLCS MVP. Game 6 was the last game ever played at Busch Memorial Stadium.

This would be the last playoff series win by the Astros as a member of the National League, as in 2013 they would join the American League. Four years later, they would win the 2017 World Series against the Los Angeles Dodgers.

2005 World Series

(AL1) Chicago White Sox vs. (NL4) Houston Astros 

This was the first postseason meeting between the White Sox and Astros, and the first World Series ever played in the state of Texas. The White Sox swept the Astros to win their first World Series title since 1917, ending the Curse of the Black Sox. 

Even though this World Series ended in a sweep, all four games were decided by two runs or less. The White Sox took Game 1 by a narrow 5-3 score, a game which was notable for Roger Clemens' shortest World Series start, which lasted two innings and 53 pitches due to a sore hamstring. In Game 2, the Astros possessed a 4-2 lead going into the bottom of the seventh inning, until Chicago's Paul Konerko hit a grand slam to put the White Sox in the lead. The Astros tied the game in the top of the ninth thanks to a base hit from José Vizcaíno which scored two runs. However, the White Sox prevailed in the bottom of the ninth, as Astros' closer Brad Lidge gave up a walk-off home run to Scott Podsednik. In Game 3, the Astros held a 4-0 lead after four innings of play, however the White Sox rallied with a 5-run fifth inning to take the lead. The Astros tied the game in the bottom of the eighth, and then remained scoreless until the top of the fourteenth inning, where the White Sox scored two runs to take the lead for good, and closed out the Astros in the bottom of the inning to take a commanding three games to none series lead. Then, after seven scoreless innings in Game 4, Chicago's Jermaine Dye drove in Willie Harris to take a 1-0 lead, which the White Sox would not relinquish as they closed out the Astros in the ninth to secure their first title in 88 years.

It was the first championship won by a team from Chicago since 1998, when the Michael Jordan-led Chicago Bulls completed their second three-peat. 11 years later, the other Chicago baseball team, the Chicago Cubs, would end the Curse of the Billy Goat by winning the 2016 World Series.

This would be the last postseason appearance by the Astros as a member of the National League, as in 2013 they joined the American League. They returned to the postseason in 2015, but lost to the Kansas City Royals in five games in the ALDS. They would return to the World Series in 2017, defeating the Los Angeles Dodgers in seven games. The White Sox and Astros would meet again in the ALDS in 2021, which was won by the Astros in four games.

References

External links
 League Baseball Standings & Expanded Standings - 2005

 
Major League Baseball postseason